Kalpana Iyer (born 26 July 1956) is an Indian former actress, singer, and model, who is best known for her works in Hindi cinema throughout the 1980s and 1990s. She appeared in over 100 films, and is accredited for her performances in many popular dance numbers as well as for her supporting and guest roles in many films.

Career

Modelling 
She was the first runner-up at Miss India in 1978,. She went on to represent her country at the Miss World 1978 beauty pageant where she was a top 15 semi-finalist.

Acting 
Kalpana mostly appeared as a vamp in a number of Hindi films, continuing in the tradition of Bindu, Helen and Aruna Irani. Some of her famous dance numbers are "Hari om Hari" in Pyaara Dushman (1980), "Tu Mujhe Jaan" in Wardat (1981) and "Rambha Ho" in Armaan (1981). Some of her renowned films are Satte Pe Satta (1982), Disco Dancer (1982), Anjaam (1994), Raja Hindustani (1996), and Hum Saath Saath Hain (1999). She was critically acclaimed for her performance as a cruel prison warden in Anjaam which also featured Bollywood superstars Madhuri Dixit and Shah Rukh Khan. As of 2019, Iyer has appeared in a variety of films, as well as working on television.

Other ventures 
Iyer also dabbled in singing, and performed in shows. She is currently managing a restaurant in Dubai called "The Moghul Room" which is owned by former Bollywood actor Rajan Sippy.

Personal life 
She was born in a Tamil Brahmin family Despite being considered as one of the bold actresses of her time, Iyer mentioned how she had a rather conservative mindset and was often misunderstood. Iyer told FirstPost in 2019:

Filmography

Film 
Throughout her career, Iyer has appeared in over 100 films.

Poonam (1981)
Hum Se Badkar Kaun (1981) as Shalu
Satte Pe Satta (1982) as Ranjeet Mistress
Hum Hain Lajawaab (1984) as Alif-Laila, Dancer
Nallavanukku Nallavan (1984) item number
Ameer Aadmi Gharib Aadmi (1985)Zakhmi Aurat (1988) as KantaMil Gayee Manzil Mujhe(1989) as KaminiAbhi To Main Jawan Hoon (1989)Laadla as KaminiAnjaam (1994) as Jailor WardenGundaraj (1995) as Public ProsecutorHum Saath Saath Hain'' (1999) as Shobha Mishra

Television

References

External links

Femina Miss India winners
Indian expatriates in the United Arab Emirates
Indian film actresses
Actresses in Hindi cinema
20th-century Indian actresses
Miss World 1978 delegates
People from Amroha
Actresses from Uttar Pradesh
Female models from Uttar Pradesh
1956 births
Living people